Minuscule 726 (in the Gregory-Aland numbering), ε384 (von Soden), is a Greek minuscule manuscript of the New Testament written on parchment. Palaeographically it has been assigned to the 13th century. The manuscript is lacunose. Scrivener labelled it as 882e.

Description 

The codex contains the text of the four Gospels on 250 parchment leaves (size ), with lacuna in Matthew 20:17-24:41.

The text is written in single column per page, 23 lines per page.

There is also a division according to the smaller Ammonian Sections, but without references to the Eusebian Canons.

It contains pictures and some Armenian notes (later hand).

Text 

The Greek text of the codex is a representative of the Byzantine text-type. Aland did not place it in any Category.

According to the Claremont Profile Method it represents the textual family Πb in Luke 1, Luke 10, and Luke 20.

History 

Gregory dated the manuscript to the 13th century. The manuscript is currently dated by the INTF to the 13th century.

It was written in the same scriptorium as minuscule 435.

Formerly it belonged to Franciscan in Paris.

It was added to the list of New Testament manuscripts by Scrivener (882) and Gregory (726). Gregory saw the manuscript in 1891.

The manuscript is now housed at the Royal Library of Belgium (11375) in Brussels.

See also 

 List of New Testament minuscules
 Biblical manuscript
 Textual criticism

References

Further reading 

 
 Martin Wittek, Album de paléographie grecque (Ghent, 1967), 21

Greek New Testament minuscules
13th-century biblical manuscripts
Manuscripts in the Royal Library of Belgium